Foreign relations between Argentina and Egypt have existed for decades. Diplomatic relations were established between both countries in 1947. Argentina has an embassy in Cairo and Egypt has an embassy in Buenos Aires.

Economic relations
The countries signed an economic co-operation protocol in 1998, during a visit of Abdul Shara, the secretary general of the Union of Egyptian Trade Chambers to Argentina. At that time, the yearly value of trade between the two countries was $460 million, with Argentine exports comprising some $456.3 million of that total, and Egyptian exports comprising just $3.7 million. In 2016, Argentine exports to Egypt amounted to $1.8 billion while Egyptian exports to Argentina amounted to just US$8.2 million.

High level visits
The first Argentine Head of State to make an official visit to Egypt was Carlos Menem, who travelled to Egypt in 1988 and observed the opening of the Egyptian atomic reactor, which had been constructed with Argentine assistance.

Cristina Kirchner, the President of Argentina, made an official visit to Egypt in November 2008, meeting with Egyptian president Hosni Mubarak, as well as the secretary general of the League of Arab States, Amr Mussa. Her entourage included representatives of 80 Argentine companies, which met with 300 Egyptian business to discuss possible trade arrangements. Meetings between business representatives of the two nations focused on expanding the ability of Argentine business to reach the Egyptian markets for food, mechanical products and gas.

In 1999, Minister of Interior for Argentina Carlos Corach travelled to Cairo, where he met with the Egyptian Minister of Interior Habib El-Adli for discussions on co-operation between the two countries in dealing with terrorism and organized crime. This was followed by an Argentine delegation led by Jorge Gonzalez, the deputy minister of economy of Argentina, who went to Cairo to discuss agreements on the use of harbors.

See also 
 Foreign relations of Argentina
 Foreign relations of Egypt

References

External links 
  List of Treaties ruling relations Argentina and Egypt (Argentine Foreign Ministry, in Spanish)
 Egyptian-Argentinean relations - From the Egypt State Information Service